Vanamagan is a 2017 Indian Tamil-language action adventure film written and directed by A. L. Vijay. The film stars Jayam Ravi and Sayyeshaa, with Prakash Raj, Thambi Ramaiah, and Varun in supporting roles. The music was composed by Harris Jayaraj. with cinematography by Tirru and editing by Anthony. The venture began production in September 2016, and the film was released on 23 June 2017.

Plot 
  
Kavya's parents died in an accident in her childhood. They leave her their industry on her name (Kavya Industries), which is run by her father's friend Rajasekhar (who is very much interested in her wealth). One day at work, Rajasekhar asks Kavya to sign an asset. He learns that Kavya and her friends planned to spend their New Year in Bora Bora, but they could not do so because their passports were on hold. Rajasekhar suggests that Kavya and her friends go to the Andaman Islands.

While Kavya and her friends are in Andaman, they behave too notorious. While escaping from the police, they hit Jara with her car. No hospital in Andaman would treat Jara, so Kavya decides to bring him to Chennai. She and her friends go to the airport and dress Jara like a normal person. There, Kavya passes Jara's name off as "K. Vaasi". The friends manage to admit Vaasi at a Chennai hospital. Sometime later, Kavya arrives at the hospital to find Vaasi wildly beating up people. She then goes back home, where she learns from her cook Pandian that the hospital sedated Vaasi and dropped him at home. The morning afterwards, Kavya and her servants train Vaasi to act like a human.

Some time later, Kavya's birthday is being celebrated, and Rajasekhar tells that they are also celebrating a 2,000-crore German project. Vicky finds Kavya and tells her that he cannot stand Vaasi. He also tells her that he had told his father about their relationship. Kavya then questions Vicky, and both start arguing. At that moment, Vaasi barges into the room. When Vicky tries to attack Vaasi, the latter gruesomely attacks him. Although Vaasi later comes to his senses, Rajasekhar calls the police, who encase Vaasi in a net and take him away.

At the hospital where Vicky gets treated, Rajasekhar is told that the former has a fractured bone in his neck and will have to wear a cervical collar for life. He is also told that the documents for the German project will need to be signed and dispatched. At the Andaman police station, the police say to take Vaasi to the forest and finish him off. Kavya and Pandian arrive at the police station, where Vaasi breaks free and kills the police officers. The trio flees to the forest as they are being followed by the police. Vaasi beats the police up and is held at gunpoint by Shanmugam, who is surprised to see that he is alive. Shanmugam reveals to Kavya that Vaasi's real name is Jara. Vaasi then meets up with his people. Meanwhile, a young girl wanders into the forest and gets worried upon seeing a tiger. Jara saves the girl from the tiger, but the tiger suddenly falls as Vaasi had cut its body. Vaasi manages to stitch the wound and save the tiger. He then takes the girl with him to his tribe. Meanwhile, the German company asks the Andaman police to get the project cleared. Despite the efforts to evacuate the tribe, they refuse to relocate. Shanmugam orders the police to shoot the tribe, when he suddenly hears his daughter's voice. His daughter ended up being the person whom Vaasi saved from the tiger. At night, Vaasi is sleeping and hears people screaming. He goes out to find the shelters being set on fire. A violent battle breaks out between the tribe and the police, with many people getting killed. Vaasi is also taken by the police and gets knocked out.

The film goes back to the beginning, where Shanmugam warns Vaasi about the police. Vaasi then runs away, and later, Kavya and her friends accidentally hit him with their car after escaping from the police (when they were out for Vaasi). Meanwhile, Rajasekhar, who has returned from the US, arrives at Andaman. Kavya tries to get a signal to call him, but to no avail. At the police station, Rajasekhar orders that Kavya be back within 24 hours. At the forest office, the police officer introduces Suryaprakash, a commando. Suryaprakash introduces a plan called Project Zero: there are three ways to enter the forest, and if they use full force to cover the zones, the radius of 50 kilometers will gradually reduce to zero. Meanwhile, as Vaasi, Kavya, and Pandian are walking, Pandian sees a bird and throws it. The bird turns out to be a spy camera monitored by the commandos. Vaasi, Kavya, and Pandian flee yet again as the commandos are monitoring their movements. As they are running, Vaasi suddenly gets tied to a tree. Suryaprakash and the officers plan to shoot Vaasi, but everyone hears a tiger growling, and the animal gruesomely kills the commandos.

The next morning, Rajasekhar admonishes Kavya for eloping with Vaasi even though he almost killed Vicky. Kavya reminds Rajasekhar that Vaasi and his people are in trouble as a big company is trying to snatch her land. Rajasekhar reveals that it is Kavya who has done this and shows her the documents that she signed (at the beginning of the film). As Rajasekhar abducts Kavya, they see Vaasi, and Rajasekhar hits him with his car. Kavya immediately runs to him, only for Rajasekhar to shoot him. The police then beats up Vaasi badly, but he manages to fight them. Afterwards, Vaasi beats Rajasekhar up but stops after being told to do so by Kavya. Rajasekhar spares Vaasi's life and asks Kavya to come with him. She declines and says that she does not want any more of her industries. She orders Rajasekhar to leave, to which he does so without punishing anyone.

Cast

Production
After the success of Madarasapattinam, A. L. Vijay planned to cast Suriya in the lead role. Suriya liked the script, but the role did not materialise due to budget constraints.
Later in November 2015, it was reported that A. L. Vijay would direct a film starring Jayam Ravi in the lead role. The actor confirmed that the duo would begin work on the project in the middle of 2016, following the completion of his other films. The film was reported to be about a man who escapes from the lost kingdom of Kumari Kandam. In May 2016, Vijay confirmed that the project would begin later in the year and revealed that the film would be shot extensively in the Andaman Islands. Music composer Harris Jayaraj and cinematographer Tirru were also brought in for the project.

The film was subsequently launched in September 2016 with production beginning thereafter in Chennai. Sayyeshaa was signed on to portray the leading female role in the film, marking her debut in Tamil films. Sanjay Bharathi and Varun also signed on to work on the film, with the latter revealing that he would play the heroine's love interest and that Jayam Ravi would portray a tribal man who finds himself in the city. The film teaser was officially released on 6 February 2017. The background score of the teaser was that of an African tribal music and was well received.

Release
Initially, the film had its release date fixed on 19 May 2017. Due to the announcement of the film industry strike on 30 May 2017, the producer has postponed the theatrical release to 23 June 2017. The satellite rights of the film were sold to Zee Tamil. Baradwaj Rangan of Film Companion wrote "Vanamagan gradually becomes terribly serious, and a comic adventure turns into a tiresomely earnest drama
."

Soundtrack

The film's original soundtrack is scored by Harris Jayaraj, his first collaboration with director A. L. Vijay and third film with actor Jayam Ravi after Dhaam Dhoom and Engeyum Kaadhal. This is Jayaraj's 50th film as a composer. The complete album was released on 22 April 2017.

References

External links
 

2017 films
2010s action adventure films
2010s Tamil-language films
Films directed by A. L. Vijay
Films scored by Harris Jayaraj
Indian action adventure films
Films set in forests
Tarzan films
Films shot in India
Films shot in Thailand
Films set in the Andaman and Nicobar Islands